Paradise Country is an Australian homestead where guests are shown a variety of Australian animals including koalas, kangaroos and emus. The farm tour also includes several shows which feature the making of billy tea, a stock horse demonstration and a boomerang throwing demonstration in Oxenford on the Gold Coast, Queensland.
Paradise Country opened in 2005 and is a part of the Village Roadshow Theme Parks.

See also

Village Roadshow Theme Parks

References

External links

2005 establishments in Australia
Zoos established in 2005
Village Roadshow Theme Parks
Tourist attractions on the Gold Coast, Queensland